The Doopsgezinde Weeshuis is a former orphanage in Haarlem. The complex was designed by A. van der Linden to replace the old orphanage located at the Klein Heiligland 58, which had been in use since 1634.

History

The building had running water, which was new, and two large meeting rooms for the regents, one for the 4 regents, and one for the 4 regentesses. Once a year they would dine there, and once a year all the orphans of Haarlem would be treated to buns on Pieter Teyler van der Hulst's birthday, as stipulated in his will and testament. Jan Adam Kruseman painted the large group portrait of the regents, featuring a few of the orphans wearing their habitual Mennonite orphan dress (the city orphans had one red sleeve and one blue sleeve, but Mennonite orphans wore brown).

In 1939 the building was confiscated for military purposes and the orphanage moved to Baan 25. Under german rule it became a works council, and in 1983 the archives moved here. The regent rooms have remained largely intact.

References

History on website of the North Holland archives

Buildings and structures in Haarlem
History of Haarlem
Rijksmonuments in Haarlem
Residential buildings completed in 1874